Paolo Galletti (7 March 1937 – 25 April 2015) was an Italian swimmer. He participated in two Olympic Games, in 1956 and in 1960.

See also 
 Italian record progression 400 metres freestyle

References 

 Sport Reference profile
  Agenda Diana profile

1937 births
2015 deaths
Sportspeople from the Metropolitan City of Florence
Italian male freestyle swimmers
Olympic swimmers of Italy
Swimmers at the 1956 Summer Olympics
Swimmers at the 1960 Summer Olympics
European Aquatics Championships medalists in swimming
People from Tavarnelle Val di Pesa
20th-century Italian people